"Johnny Will" is a song by Pat Boone that reached number 35 on the Bllboard Hot 100 in January 1962.

Track listing

Charts

References 

1961 songs
1961 singles
Pat Boone songs
Dot Records singles